West Oxfordshire is a local government district in northwest Oxfordshire, England, including towns such as Woodstock, Burford, Chipping Norton, Charlbury, Carterton and Witney, where the council is based.

Area
The area is mainly rural downland and forest, with the main economic activities being farming and associated trades.

The district was created on 1 April 1974, under the Local Government Act 1972, by the merger of Chipping Norton Municipal Borough, Woodstock Municipal Borough, Witney Urban District, Chipping Norton Rural District and Witney Rural District.

West Oxfordshire lies within the River Thames catchment area, with the Thames itself and its tributaries including the River Evenlode and River Windrush running through the area. Parts of the district suffered severe flooding during the 2007 floods in the UK.

Governance

Elections to West Oxfordshire District Council are held in three out of every four years, with one third of the seats on the council being elected at each election. Since the first election to the council in 1973 the only political party to have had a majority on the council is the Conservative Party, although there have been periods where no party has had a majority and independents had a majority from 1973 to 1976 and from 1990 to 1992. The council went into no overall control following the 2022 local elections with the Liberal Democrats agreeing to form an executive with Labour and the Greens. Liberal Democrat Andy Graham subsequently became the leader of the council.

As of the 2022 local elections, the council consisted of the following councillors:

Headquarters
The council is based at the former Witney Rural District Council offices on Woodgreen in Witney. The building was built as a large house in 1887 for one of the town's blanket manufacturers, and was originally known as Springfield, 39 Woodgreen. The building was acquired by Witney Rural District Council around 1966 and is now known as Council Offices, Woodgreen.

References

 
Oxfordshire, West
Non-metropolitan districts of Oxfordshire